Peperomia venosa is a species of herb from the genus 'Peperomia'. It grows in wet tropical biomes. It was discovered by Truman G. Yuncker in 1950.

Etymology
venosa came from the Latin word "venosus". Venosus means "veiny" or "venous".

Distribution
Peperomia venosa is native to Colombia. Specimens can be found at an altitude of 900–2870 meters.

Colombia
Nariño
La Planada Nature Reserve
Putumayo
Valle del Cauca
Cali

References

venosa
Flora of South America
Flora of Colombia
Plants described in 1950
Taxa named by Truman G. Yuncker